Larry Crawford (born December 18, 1959) is an American former Canadian football player. He was a CFL All-Star four times and was a part of the BC Lions' Grey Cup championship team in 1985.

High school career
Crawford is a graduate of Miami Palmetto High School.

College career
Crawford played college football at the Iowa State University.

Professional career
Crawford played in the Canadian Football League for nine years and in 134 games. He played defensive back for the BC Lions from 1981 to 1989 and for the Toronto Argonauts in 1989. He was named a Division All-Star in each season between 1983 and 1987 and was a CFL All-Star four times. Upon his retirement, he ranked second all-time in punt return yards with 4,159 and fifth all-time in interceptions with 52.

Crawford was announced as a member of the Canadian Football Hall of Fame 2023 class on March 16, 2023.

Coaching career
Crawford is the defensive back and wide receiver coach at Valley Christian High School located in Cerritos, California.

Personal life
Crawford's son, J. P. Crawford, is a professional baseball player for the Seattle Mariners. His daughter, Eliza, played softball for the Cal State Fullerton Titans and his daughter, Julia played volleyball for the Titans.

References

1959 births
Living people
Miami Palmetto Senior High School alumni
Iowa State Cyclones football players
BC Lions players
Toronto Argonauts players
American players of Canadian football
Canadian football defensive backs
Players of American football from Miami
Players of Canadian football from Miami